Ma Xuejun (born 26 March 1985, in Shandong) is a Chinese discus thrower. Her personal best throw is 65.00 metres, first achieved in August 2006 in Shijiazhuang. The Chinese, and Asian, record is currently held by Xiao Yanling with 71.68 metres.

She was successful on junior level, winning both the 2001 World Youth Championships, the 2002 World Junior Championships and the 2004 World Junior Championships. Her first medal on senior level was a silver medal at the 2006 Asian Games. She then finished ninth at the 2007 World Championships.

Achievements

References

1985 births
Living people
Athletes (track and field) at the 2008 Summer Olympics
Athletes (track and field) at the 2012 Summer Olympics
Chinese female discus throwers
Olympic athletes of China
Athletes from Shandong
Asian Games medalists in athletics (track and field)
Athletes (track and field) at the 2006 Asian Games
Asian Games silver medalists for China
Medalists at the 2006 Asian Games